Squash blossoms (called courgette flowers in Great Britain) are the edible flowers of Cucurbita species, particularly Cucurbita pepo, the species that produces zucchini (courgette), marrow, spaghetti squash, and many other types of squash.

Availability
Squash blossoms are highly perishable, and as such are rarely stocked in supermarkets.  Male and female squash blossoms can be used interchangeably, but picking only male flowers (leaving some for pollination) allows the plant to also produce some fruit (squash).

Culinary uses
Squash blossoms may be stuffed, battered and fried, or made into soup. The flowers have a subtle flavor, reminiscent of young zucchinis, and can be eaten raw.

Stuffed blossoms 

The squash blossoms are frequently stuffed and cooked in some Southeast European and Middle Eastern cuisines. The stuffing frequently includes a soft cheese, such as ricotta. 

In Turkey, squash blossoms are usually stuffed with rice. There are two variants of the dish; the variant that contains minced meat in its stuffing is usually served hot, meanwhile the meatless zeytinyağlı kabak çiçeği dolması (English: stuffed squash blossoms with olive oil) ) is served cold and consumed frequently as a meze with rakı. The dish is especially popular in the Aegean Region of Turkey and associated with the Cretan Turks that migrated to Turkey due to the population exchange between Greece and Turkey. 

Both Turkish and Greek Cypriots cook stuffed blossoms in a similar fashion. Cypriot Greek name for the dish is kupepia me anthus.

Other 
In the Campania, Calabria, Latium and Sicily regions of Italy and in some parts of Catalonia (Spain) they are frequently made into fritters.

Its use is extensive in Mexican cuisine, especially in Central Mexico, where it is used for soups and as a filling for quesadillas.

Gallery

See also
 List of stuffed dishes

References

Azerbaijani cuisine
Bosnia and Herzegovina cuisine
Bulgarian cuisine
Italian cuisine
Greek cuisine
Turkish cuisine
Cretan cuisine
Stuffed vegetable dishes
Turkish cuisine dolmas and sarmas